The North Albury Football Netball Club, nicknamed the Hoppers, is an Australian rules football and netball club playing in the Ovens & Murray Football League (O&MFL). They are incorporated as part of the North Albury Sports Club licensed club at Bunton Park in North Albury, Albury, where they play their home matches. The club has won six O&MFL premierships. The Hoppers currently play in forest green guernseys with a gold vee and the "Hopper" logo on the right side. Previous guernsey designs included a dark green and gold design similar to the West Coast Eagles' classic wingtip design (up to 2008) and a gold design with two dark green vees over the yoke. The club song is a version of "Join in the Chorus" with some words altered from the AFL Kangaroos version.

History
The club was formed in 1943, and for the first few years of their existence played in the Chiltern & District Football League, then moved to the O&MFL in 1947. For a short time in the early 1950s they also played a reserves team in the Hume Football League. Bunton Park was established during the post-World War II period in an area that was quickly becoming established with housing. Bunton Park is named after Cleaver Bunton, long-time mayor of Albury, rather than his famous footballing brother Haydn Bunton, although neither played for North Albury.

In the early 1980s the club was beset by financial difficulties causing it to fall in arrears in paying match payments to its players. In the meantime the club committee was endeavouring to establish a licensed club at its ground, which would allow it to serve alcohol outside of match times and house poker machines. With the establishment of the licensed club in 1984, the club's future in the O&MFL was secured.

A large number of North Albury players have gone on to play in the VFL/AFL, such as 1984 Morris Medallist Rudy Yonson, who played a number of games with the Sydney Swans, and most famously Brett Kirk, who played with North Albury up to the 1998 season and then joined the rookie list of the Sydney Swans on trial the following year, later being elevated to the main list and being an integral part of the Swans' 2005 premiership-winning side.

As many as 17 players have been recruited from North Albury to the VFL/AFL including Peter Curtis (North), Ross Henshaw (North), Don Ross (Footscray)& Brian Leahy (Melbourne) amongst others. Anthony Miles, the 2014 star recruit for Richmond from GWS, also played his junior football at North Albury and Howlong.

The three-time AFL premiership player Jason Akermanis coached the club in 2013–14. Other ex-VFL/AFL players to have coached the club include Tim Robb and John Sharrock.

North Albury traditionally play an Anzac Day fixture against cross-town rivals, the Albury Tigers, with the venue alternating between the two clubs every year.

Football Premierships
Seniors
Chiltern & District Football Association 
1946
O&MFL 
1948, 1955, 1980, 1984, 1999, 2002.
Reserves
O&MFL 
1954, 2000 

Thirds
O&MFL 
Nil

VFL / AFL Players
The following footballers played with North ALbury FNC prior to playing VFL / AFL senior football and / or were drafted. The year indicates their VFL / AFL debut.

 1952 - Don Ross - Footscray
 1955 - Bill Barton - North Melbourne
 1955 - Peter Curtis - North Melbourne
 1957 - Vin Bourke - North Melbourne
 1960 - Brian Leahy - Melbourne
 1963 - Geoff Doubleday - Fitzroy
 1971 - Ross Henshaw - North Melbourne
 1980 - Paul Ross - Footscray
 1980 - Graham Schodde - St. Kilda
 1985 - Rudy Yonson - Sydney Swans
 1988 - Gerard Butts - Carlton
 1999 - Ben Hollands - Richmond
 1999 - Brett Kirk - Sydney Swans
 2001 - Brent Piltz - Sydney Swans
 2015 - Anthony Miles - Richmond

Team song

Their team song is:

Out we come, out we come, out we come to play hey.
 
Just for recreation's sake to pass the time away, oh Lots of fun, heaps of fun, enjoy yourself today, North Albury boys are hard to beat, when they come out to play. 

Sooooo join in the chorus and sing it one and all, Join in the chorus, North Albury's on the ball. Good old North Albury, they're champions you'll agree, North Albury is the team to play to win for you and me HEY

See also
Past and present North Albury Football Club players

Bibliography
Johnston, David (20 May 2004). "Green and Gold didn't fold in '84" Border Mail
Halloran, Jessica (10 September 2004) Never-give-up Kirk arrives The Melbourne Age

References

External links

Official website
1948 - North Albury FC - Team Photo

Ovens & Murray Football League clubs
Sport in Albury, New South Wales
1943 establishments in Australia
Sports clubs established in 1943
Australian rules football clubs established in 1943
Netball teams in New South Wales
North Albury Football Club players